Kovalyovo is a rural locality (a selo) and the administrative center of Kovalyovskoye Rural Settlement, Liskinsky District, Voronezh Oblast, Russia. The population was 1,303 as of 2010. There are 23 streets.

Geography 
Kovalyovo is located 30 km southwest of Liski (the district's administrative centre) by road. Shepelev is the nearest rural locality.

References 

Rural localities in Liskinsky District